"Rock That Body" is a song  by the Black Eyed Peas from their fifth studio album The E.N.D (2009). The song serves as the fifth international single from the album, and was released in Australia on January 29, 2010, in the United Kingdom on March 15 and in the United States on May 11. The song peaked at number nine on the US Billboard Hot 100, becoming the fifth top ten hit from the album.

Composition 
Co-produced by French DJ/producer David Guetta, the song heavily samples from Rob Base and DJ E-Z Rock's "It Takes Two", making use of the line "I wanna rock right now" multiple times, as well as the drum break, and part of the "Yeah! Woo!" line. The Black Eyed Peas use Auto-Tune throughout the song, and Fergie's voice has been notably high-pitched. Spin described "Rock That Body" as "trance-y". The song is most known to critics as a robotic party track on the album. The song has been compared to be stylistically similar to Flo Rida, whose song "Club Can't Handle Me" (from the motion picture Step Up 3D) Guetta would later go on to produce.

Critical reception
Fraser McAlpine of the BBC Chart Blog gave "Rock That Body" three out of five stars and called it "a party banger". "Rock That Body" was well-reviewed by Mike Schiller of PopMatters. Alex Fletcher of Digital Spy gave the song a positive review stating: "It's got plenty of pounding beats, synths that sound like they've been filled with Red Bull and more twisted vocal effects than an mp3 of Akon cutting loose in a vocoder factory. It's pretty simple stuff and it will no doubt grate something rotten on the 36th listen..."

Commercial performance
The song was a success, reaching the top ten in many countries and top twenty in a number of others, too. 
On the US Billboard Hot 100, the song peaked at number nine, making it their fifth consecutive top ten hit. For airplay, it proved to be their lowest-charting song since non-single "Gone Going" from their fourth studio album Monkey Business (2005), released to radio stations in early 2006.

Music video

The video was filmed on January 13, 2010, at Paramount Studios in Los Angeles, California. Directed by Rich Lee, it was shot back to back with the video for "Imma Be", the fourth song on The E.N.D. The two songs were mashed up into a medley, which is titled "Imma Be Rocking That Body". The video is the sequel for the "Imma Be" video and the second half of the "Imma Be Rocking That Body" video, which premiered on Vevo and Dipdive on Tuesday, February 16, 2010. The videos were separated for music channels with the introduction and conclusion removed. The video is described as a futuristic Wizard of Oz. It begins with the Black Eyed Peas and their good robot arriving at a city, the people in the city are stuck in a glitch. The 4 members of the group shoot them with their stereo-guns to end their loop so they could continue dancing. As things are going well, the bad robot appears and kidnaps Fergie, will.i.am chases after it with his own robot while Fergie fights the bad robot and the other two members free the remaining people. After many failed attempts, will.i.am manages to shoot the bad robot, which initiates a dance-off with the good robot. The video ends as the bad robot runs out of energy and collapses. The "Imma Be Rocking That Body" video closes with a scene which reveals the entire story to be Fergie's dream as the other members find her barely conscious following her motorcycle accident in the introduction. As they check to see if she is okay, Fergie excitedly begins to tell them of her idea for their next music video.

Track listings
 UK CD Single

 Digital Download E.P.

Personnel
Songwriting - will.i.am, apl.de.ap, Taboo, Fergie, David Guetta, Mark Knight, Adam Walder, Jean Baptiste, Jamie Munson, Robert Ginyard
Vocals - will.i.am, apl.de.ap, Taboo, Fergie
Production - David Guetta, will.i.am, Mark Knight, Funkagenda
Keyboards - Mark Knight, Adam Walder, will.i.am
Guitar, additional keyboards, additional vocals - Hal Ritson
Arrangement - will.i.am

Source:

Charts

Weekly charts

Year-end charts

Certifications

Release history

See also
List of number-one dance hits of 2010 (UK)

References

2010 singles
Black Eyed Peas songs
Interscope Records singles
2009 songs
Songs written by apl.de.ap
Songs written by David Guetta
Songs written by James Brown
Songs written by Taboo (rapper)
Songs written by Jean-Baptiste (songwriter)
Songs written by Fergie (singer)
Songs written by will.i.am
Song recordings produced by will.i.am
Songs about dancing
Song recordings produced by David Guetta
Music videos directed by Rich Lee